The 66th Infantry Division (66-ya Pekhotnaya Diviziya) was an infantry formation of the Russian Imperial Army.

Organization
1st Brigade
261st Infantry Regiment
262nd Infantry Regiment
2nd Brigade
263rd Infantry Regiment
264th Infantry Regiment

References

Infantry divisions of the Russian Empire